This is a list of schools for the deaf, organized by country.

Africa

Kenya 
Humble Hearts School
Kisii School for the Deaf

Tanzania 
Tabora Deaf-Mute Institute

Asia

India 
Agostino Vicini's Special School
Dr. M. G. R. Home and Higher Secondary School for the Speech and Hearing Impaired
Pratheeksha (special school)

Japan 
Fukui Prefectural School for the Deaf
National University Corporation Tsukuba University of Technology (deaf program)
Central School for the Deaf

Korea 
 Gwangju Inhwa School

Malaysia 
 SMK Pendidikan Khas Persekutuan

Nepal 
Naxal School for the Deaf

Pakistan 
Family Educational Services Foundation (Deaf Reach Program)
Ida Rieu School

Philippines 
Bohol Deaf Academy
CAP College Foundation
De La Salle–College of Saint Benilde
International Deaf Education Association
Manila Christian Computer Institute for the Deaf
Miriam College

Europe

France 
Institut National de Jeunes Sourds de Paris

Italy 
Antonio Provolo Institute for the Deaf

Ireland 
Claremont Institution

United Kingdom 
Bulmershe Court (offers BA in Theatre Arts, Education and Deaf Studies)
Centre for Deaf Studies, Bristol
Donaldson's College
Exeter Royal Academy for Deaf Education –The Deaf Academy, Exmouth
Jordanstown Schools
Mary Hare School
Nottinghamshire Deaf Society
Ovingdean Hall School (1891-2001) 
Seashell Trust
St John's Catholic School for the Deaf

North America

Canada

United States 
In the United States multiple states operate specialized boarding and/or statewide schools for the deaf, along with the blind; in most states the two groups had separate statewide schools, though in some they are combined.

In 2003, in addition to Nebraska, which closed its residential deaf school in 1998, New Hampshire and Nevada do not have state-operated schools for the deaf.

Deaf Residential Schools

Deaf day schools

Defunct deaf schools 

Higher education
 Gallaudet University
 National Technical Institute for the Deaf (est. 1965)
 California State University, Northridge 

Recreational organizations
 Project Insight

United States territories 
Evangelical School for the Deaf (Puerto Rico)

Oceania

Australia 
Royal Institute for Deaf and Blind Children
Victorian College for the Deaf

New Zealand 
Kelston Deaf Education Centre
Van Asch College

See also 

PEN-International

References

External links 
Schools and Programs for Deaf and Hard of Hearing Students in the United States
U.S. State Residential Schools for the Deaf
World Deaf Directory - Deaf Schools

Deaf
Deaf